Buchs SG railway station is a railway station in Buchs, in the Swiss canton of St. Gallen. It is an intermediate stop on the Chur–Rorschach line and western terminus of the Feldkirch–Buchs line to Austria and Liechtenstein. It is served by local and long-distance trains. As the station is located just north of the crossing of the Rhine between Switzerland and Liechtenstein, long-distance trains traveling between Zürich and points east must reverse direction.

The station is not to be confused with Buchs AG railway station (located in Buchs, canton of Aargau), or with Buchs-Dällikon railway station (located in Buchs, canton of Zürich).

Services

Long-distance 
The following long-distance services call at Buchs SG:

 EuroCity Transalpin: Single round-trip per day over the Chur–Rorschach and Feldkirch–Buchs lines between Zürich Hauptbahnhof and Graz Hauptbahnhof.
 InterRegio: Hourly service over the Chur–Rorschach line between Zürich Hauptbahnhof and Chur
 Railjet Express: Four round-trips per day over the Chur–Rorschach and Feldkirch–Buchs lines from Zürich Hauptbahnhof to Vienna, Budapest, or Bratislava. 
 Nightjet/EuroNight: Overnight trains over the Chur–Rorschach and Feldkirch–Buchs lines from Zürich Hauptbahnhof to Graz, Vienna, Prague, Budapest, or Zagreb.

Local 
Buchs SG is served by the St. Gallen S-Bahn and Austrian Federal Railways (ÖBB) local trains:

 : hourly service over the Chur–Rorschach line via Sargans (circular operation).
 ÖBB: infrequent service over the Feldkirch–Buchs line to Feldkirch.

Customs
Buchs SG is, for customs purposes, a border station for passengers arriving from Austria. Customs checks may be performed in the station or on board trains by Swiss officials. Systematic passport controls were abolished when Switzerland joined the Schengen Area in 2008.

References

External links 
 
 

Railway stations in the canton of St. Gallen
Swiss Federal Railways stations